Flisa may refer to:

Places
Flisa, a village in Åsnes municipality in Innlandet county, Norway
Flisa (river), a river in Innlandet county, Norway
Flisa Station, a railway station in Åsnes municipality in Innlandet county, Norway

Other
Flisa IL, a sports club in Åsnes municipality in Innlandet county, Norway

See also
Flyssa